The Municipal President of Ciudad Juárez, officially the Constitutional Municipal President of Juárez (Presidente Municipal Constitucional de Juárez), is the head of local government in Juárez,  a populous industrial municipality in the north of the Mexican state of Chihuahua. The office is the equivalent to a mayor The population of the seat of the municipality (Ciudad Juárez) accounts for the majority of the municipality's population.

List of municipal presidents of  Juárez

  1940–1941: Teófilo Borunda
  1942–1943: Antonio J. Bermúdez
  1944–1946: Alfredo Chávez Amparán
  1947–1949: Carlos Villarreal
  1950: Francisco Triana Parra
  1950–1952: Víctor Manuel Ortíz
  1953–1955: Pedro N. García Martínez
  1956: Margarito Herrera López
  1959–1959: René Mascareñas Miranda
  1959–1962: Humberto Escobar
  1962–1963: Félix Alonso Lugo
  1963–1965: Aureliano González Vargas
  1965: Felipe Dávila Baranda
  1965–1968: Armando González Soto
  1968–1971: Bernardo Norzagaray
  1971–1974: Mario Jáquez Provencio
  1974–1977: Raúl Lezama Gil
  1977–1980: Manuel Quevedo Reyes
  1980–1983: José Reyes Estrada
  1983–1986: Francisco Barrio
  1986: Miguel Agustín Corral
  1986–1989: Jaime Bermudez Cuarón
  1989–1992: Jesús Macías Delgado
  1992: Carlos Ponce Torres
  1992–1995: Francisco Villarreal Torres
  1995–1998: Ramón Galindo Noriega
  1998: Enrique Flores Almeida 
  1998–2001: Gustavo Elizondo
  2001–2002: José Reyes Ferriz, interim appointment following cancellation of the elections
  2002–2004: Jesús Alfredo Delgado
  2004–2007: Héctor Murguía Lardizábal
  2007–2010: José Reyes Ferriz
  2010–2013: Héctor Murguía Lardizábal, reelected 
  2013–2015: Enrique Serrano Escobar
  2015–2016: Javier González Mocken
  2016–2021: Héctor Armando Cabada Alvídrez

See also
 Timeline of Ciudad Juárez

References
Juárez, Enciclopedia de los Municipios de México, INAFED. Accessed 31 October 2008.

Ciudad Juárez
 
Juárez